The women's 1500 metres event at the 2002 Asian Athletics Championships was held in Colombo, Sri Lanka on 11 August.

Results

References

2002 Asian Athletics Championships
1500 metres at the Asian Athletics Championships
2002 in women's athletics